Winceby is a village in the civil parish of Lusby with Winceby (where the population is included) in the East Lindsey district of Lincolnshire, England.

The village is notable for the (Civil War) Battle of Winceby, which took place in 1643, when the Royalist army was defeated by the Roundheads at "Slash Hill".

There is a church, St Margaret's, and a garage. The village is very close to the Snipe Dales nature reserve and country park, owned by the Lincolnshire Wildlife Trust.

See also
Battle of Winceby

References

External links

Villages in Lincolnshire
East Lindsey District